Mount Conner, also known as Atila, Artilla, or Fool-uru,  is a mountain located in the southwest corner of the Northern Territory of Australia,  southeast of Lake Amadeus, in the locality of Petermann. It lies within the Curtin Springs cattle station in Pitjantjatjara country, close to the site of the Kungkarangkalpa (Seven Sisters) Dreaming.

Geology
The sides of Mount Conner are blanketed by scree (talus) and its top is blanketed by colluvium. The base of Mount Conner is surrounded by alluvium.

The summit of Mount Conner, along with the summits of low domes in the Kata Tjuta complex and summit levels of Uluru, is an erosional remnant of a Cretaceous geomorphic surface. It is considered to be a classic example of an inselberg created by erosion of surrounding strata.

See also

List of mountains of the Northern Territory

References

Additional sources

Further reading

Conner, Mount